An Awesome Wave is the debut album by English indie rock band alt-J, released on 25 May 2012 through Infectious. The album includes the singles "Matilda"/"Fitzpleasure", "Breezeblocks" and "Tessellate". It peaked at number thirteen on the UK Albums Chart, and also charted in Belgium, France, Netherlands and Switzerland. An Awesome Wave won the 2012 British Barclaycard Mercury Prize, and in 2013 was named Album of the Year at the Ivor Novello Awards. The title is a reference to a quote from the 2000 American-Canadian film American Psycho.

Artwork
The album artwork for An Awesome Wave is a multi-layered radar image of the Ganges river delta in Bangladesh and India. The image in each of the three layers was acquired by the European Space Agency's Envisat Earth-observing satellite, taken separately on 20 January 24 February and 31 March 2009. The overlaid image, titled Ganges' Dazzling Delta, exposes a multitude of colours arising from the variations in background radiation occurring between the three acquisition times.

Critical reception

An Awesome Wave received generally positive reviews from music critics. At Metacritic, which assigns a normalised rating out of 100 to reviews from mainstream critics, the album received an average score of 71, based on 20 reviews, which indicates "generally favorable reviews". Jenny Stevens of NME felt that "the charm of Alt-J's musical scatterbrain is that it works", describing the album as "on the surface... smart alt-pop" while noting that the band "have messed with the formula just enough to make this a brilliantly disquieting debut" and that "in refusing to submit to the rigours of a genre, they might just have made themselves masters of their own." Andy Baber of musicOMH praised the band's ability to mix different musical styles and instruments on the album without coming off as forced or over-complicated. Similarly, BBC Music's Jen Long wrote that An Awesome Wave "spans every workable idea, genre, and influence that can be crammed under the guitar music umbrella, yet it never feels disorientating" and called it an "entirely comprehendible and accessible collection of beautiful pop songs."

Ruth Singleton of Drowned in Sound described An Awesome Wave as "a beautifully rounded, awesome debut album" and said that "whatever Alt-J were aiming for with their debut album, they have managed to prove their value as talented musicians, literary enthusiasts and imagery aficionados." Joe Zadeh of Clash praised the band as "young, yet somehow void of naivety." Jon O'Brien of AllMusic felt that the album was "occasionally guilty of pretentiousness", but that its "eclectic arrays of sound are woven together in a manner so effortlessly that the results never feel forced or contrived." In a more negative assessment, Mojo felt that the band "aim for 'cryptic experimental pop' but hit 'pompous whimsy'" and that "the whole album is uncertain and unconvincing". Laura Snapes of Pitchfork referred to the songs as "draining, elongated MOR tunes".

Commercial performance
An Awesome Wave entered the UK Albums Chart at number nineteen on sales of 6,720 copies. After winning the Mercury Prize, the album reached a new peak position of number thirteen, selling 13,527 copies. On 2 August 2013, the album was certified platinum by the British Phonographic Industry (BPI), denoting shipments in excess of 300,000 units in the UK.

In Canada, the album debuted at number thirty on the Canadian Albums Chart, selling 1,800 copies.

An Awesome Wave first charted in America on 6 October 2012, initially entering at #134. On 4 May 2013, seven months later, An Awesome Wave achieved its peak position of #80.

Track listing

On CD, "Hand-Made" is on the same track as "Taro", separated by several minutes of silence. It is not on the vinyl, however is included as a hidden track within "Taro" when downloaded with the included download code.

Personnel
Credits adapted from the liner notes of An Awesome Wave.

 Charlie Andrew – production
 Dick Beetham – mastering
 Mark Bishop – production ("Hand-Made")
 European Space Agency – cover photo provider
 Rachael Lander – cello ("Taro")
 Kirsty Mangan – string arrangements (all tracks); violin ("Tessellate", "Taro")
 St Ronan's Chamber Choir – additional vocals ("Bloodflood", "Taro")

Charts

Weekly charts

Year-end charts

Certifications

Release history

References

2012 debut albums
Albums produced by Charlie Andrew
Alt-J albums
Atlantic Records albums
Infectious Music albums
Mercury Prize-winning albums